Contoocook River Amusement Park was a trolley park in Penacook, New Hampshire. The park was developed along the south bank of the Contoocook River. For twenty cents in 1893, and up until 1925, one could ride  on the trolley from downtown Concord to Penacook to enjoy free entertainment, fireworks, swimming, dancing at a large pavilion, boating, roller-skating, bowling, and even a steamboat ride up the Contoocook River. The park closed in 1925. 

Electric Avenue, a dirt road that is part of the Concord Trail System, now leads through a wooded area where trolley car tracks once ran. Little trace of the park remains.

External links
 Contoocook River Park on penacook.org

Defunct amusement parks in the United States
Buildings and structures in Concord, New Hampshire
1925 disestablishments in New Hampshire
Amusement parks in New Hampshire